The 2004 Spengler Cup was held in Davos, Switzerland from December 26 to December 31, 2004.  All matches were played at HC Davos's home arena, Eisstadion Davos. The final was won 2-0 by HC Davos over HC Sparta Praha.

Teams participating
 HC Davos
 HC Sparta Praha
 Team Canada
 Metallurg Magnitogorsk
 HIFK

Tournament

Round-Robin results

Finals

External links
Spenglercup.ch

2004–05
2004–05 in Swiss ice hockey
2004–05 in Czech ice hockey
2004–05 in Canadian ice hockey
2004–05 in Finnish ice hockey
2004–05 in Russian ice hockey
December 2004 sports events in Europe